The 1929 Baltic Cup was held in Riga, Latvia at LSB Stadions on 14–16 August 1929. It was the second time three Baltic countries — Estonia, Latvia and Lithuania — came together to play a friendly tournament and determine the best team amongst them. Estonia won the tournament on goal difference.

Results

Statistics

Goalscorers

See also
Balkan Cup
Nordic Football Championship

References

External links
 Tournament overview at EU-Football.info

1928
1929–30 in European football
1929 in Lithuanian football
1929 in Latvian football
1929 in Estonian football
1929